Asterix and the Normans is the ninth book in the Asterix comic book series, written by René Goscinny and drawn by Albert Uderzo. It was first published in serial form in Pilote magazine, issues 340–361, in 1966. It depicts a meeting between Asterix's Gaulish village and a shipfull of Normans (Vikings).

Plot summary
The story begins with Vitalstatistix receiving a missive from his brother Doublehelix in Lutetia (Paris), to ask for the education of Doublehelix's teenage son, Justforkix. Justforkix then arrives in a sports car-like chariot. The village holds a dance in honour of his arrival; but he is unimpressed by the traditional way of dancing, snatches Cacofonix's lyre, and sings and plays in the manner of Elvix Preslix (the Rolling Menhirs in the English version). Some of the younger villagers dance to this new form; but Cacofonix tries to show off his own skills, and is struck down by Fulliautomatix. Justforkix thereupon suggests that Cacofonix's talents would be better appreciated in Lutetia.

Meanwhile, a Norman crew arrive in Gaul to discover "the meaning of fear", on grounds that they are fearless to the point of not understanding the concept, but have heard of people "flying in fear", and believe that being afraid will grant them the ability to fly. Most of the Gauls welcome the chance of a fight; but Justforkix is horrified and decides to return home. Viewing Justforkix as an expert in fear, the Normans kidnap him to teach them; but this fails, and he remains their prisoner until Asterix and Obelix come to the rescue. A small Roman patrol is also involved in the resulting fight. At length, Norman chief Timandahaf orders an end to the battle and explains his mission to the Gauls. To teach the Normans fear, Asterix sends Obelix to fetch Cacofonix, while himself remaining as a hostage. When Obelix reaches the village, he finds Cacofonix gone to perform in Lutetia, and pursues him through a series of tell-tale clues.

Meanwhile, Timandahaf becomes impatient and tries to force Justforkix to teach the secret of flight by tossing him off a cliff. Just before this can be carried out, Asterix challenges the Norman warriors; and seeing him surrounded, Justforkix gains the courage to fight as well — albeit to no visible effect. Obelix and Cacofonix stop the fight, and Cacofonix's discordant songs are exhibited to the Normans, which provokes their first real fear, and an immediate retreat to their homeland. When Asterix questions the Normans' interest in fear, Getafix replies that courage is achieved only by having first been afraid, and superseding the fear to the desired effect. Thereafter Justforkix is claimed to have gained courage himself, and the story ends with the customary banquet, but with Cacofonix as guest of honour and Fulliautomatix tied up, with his ears filled with parsley.

Historical background

In France, Normans are the descendants of Norsemen (Vikings) who invaded northern France in the late 9th century and gave their name to Normandy; wherefore the name of 'Norman' is given the Vikings in this volume. Indeed, the Norman chief tells the Gauls that they do not want to invade their country, but their descendants will do so, centuries later (they even briefly reference 1066). In the book, the Normans' heavy use of cream in recipes is a reference to stereotypes of the cuisine in Normandy.

Puns
In the original French version, Justforkix is called "Goudurix" ("a taste for risks"), a name he lives up to only towards the end.

In Finnish, the story is called Asterix ja normannien maihinnousu ("Asterix and the Landing of the Normans"). This is a reference to the Normandian maihinnousu, the standard Finnish history-book term for the Normandy Landings of 1944.

Other themes
In this story, we see Dogmatix's distress over the uprooting of trees for the first time.

This is the first album in the series since Asterix the Gaul where Cacofonix is not tied up for the story-ending banquet.

Fulliautomatix the blacksmith had previously appeared in both Asterix the Gaul and Asterix and the Banquet, but he differed somewhat from the appearance he now took in Asterix and the Normans, and he would remain essentially unchanged for the rest of the series.

Whereas Justforkix learns courage, the Roman soldier Oleaginus learns to fear the Gauls and Normans and also the means of evading confrontation, such as wasting time on making three copies of the same report (i.e. red tape).
 
When Justforkix explains his Chariot is from Mediolanum (now Milan, Italy) it is a reference to modern sports cars made there.

Adaptations
Justforkix was the star of a series of Asterix gamebooks, popular in the 1980s.

The basic storyline of the book was adapted into the animated full-length feature Asterix and the Vikings.

Rolling Menhirs is a reference to the famous rock group the Rolling Stones. In the original French it is 'Les Monkiix,' referring to The Monkees.

The book has been translated into Afrikaans, Bengali, Catalan, Croatian, Czech, Danish, Dutch, Finnish, German, Greek, Icelandic, Indonesian, Italian, Norwegian, Polish, Portuguese, Serbian, Slovene, Spanish, Swedish and Turkish.

In other languages 
French – Astérix et les Normands
German – Asterix und die Normannen
Serbian - Asteriks i Normani
Croatian - Asterix i Normani
Spanish – Asterix y los normandos 
Catalan – Astèrix i els Normands 
Portuguese – Astérix e os Normandos
Dutch – Asterix en de Noormannen
Finnish – Asterix ja normannien maihinnousu 
 Greek - Ο Αστερίξ και οι Νορμανδοί
Italian – Asterix ei normanni
Korean – 아스테릭스, 바이킹을물리치다 
Danish – Asterix og vikingerne 
Swedish – Asterix och vikingarna 
Turkish – Asteriks ve Normanlar 
Brazilian Portuguese – Asterix e os Normandos 
Polish – Asteriks i Normanowie
Bengali – Asterix O Norman Dol ( অ্যাসটেরিক্স ও নর্ম্যান দল )

Reception 

On Goodreads, it has a score of 4.12 out of 5.

References

External links 
Official English Website

Normans, Asterix and the
Works originally published in Pilote
Literature first published in serial form
1966 graphic novels
Works by René Goscinny
Comics by Albert Uderzo
Comics set in the Viking Age
Norway in fiction